Shadow Dragon(s) may refer to:

Fire Emblem: Shadow Dragon, a remake of the original Fire Emblem game for the Nintendo DS
The Shadow Dragons by James A. Owen, the fourth novel of The Chronicles of the Imaginarium Geographica
Shadow dragon, a dragon in the Dungeons & Dragons series
Shadow Dragon (aircraft), a project to develop a hypersonic spaceplane for China.
The Shadow Dragons, a group of antagonists in Dragon Ball GT

See also
 Dragon (disambiguation)